Elenito delos Reyes Galido (April 18, 1953; Malaybalay City, Bukidnon – December 5, 2017) was a Filipino bishop of the Roman Catholic Diocese of Iligan, an ecclesiastical jurisdiction covering the whole province of Lanao del Norte and the city of Iligan in the Philippines.

Biography
Galido was born in Managok, Malaybalay City, Bukidnon on April 18, 1953. His sacerdotal ordination was on April 25, 1979. He first served under the Diocese of Malaybalay. He was appointed the fourth bishop of the Diocese of Iligan on March 25, 2006, consecrated on September 8, 2006.

Before becoming a Bishop, he serve the Malaybalay Diocese as its Vicar General, Administrator of Cathedral parish, Rector of the Minor Seminary and parish priest of Kibawe, Bukidnon.

Galido was a known environmentalist. In late 1980s, he started his own reforestation project in Mt. Capistrano, Managok, Malaybalay City, Bukidnon. He mobilized the kaingin farmers of Managok to plant more trees in the watershed areas.  

Bishop Galido was a chairman of the Episcopal Commission on Culture (ECC) of the Catholic Bishops' Conference of the Philippines (CBCP).
He is the cousin of Philippine Army Inspector General, Major General Roy M. Galido and a nephew of Former Solcom Commander, Retired Brig. Gen. Alejendro A. Galido.

He died at 10:11 pm on December 5, 2017.

See also

Catholic Church in the Philippines

References

1953 births
2017 deaths
People from Bukidnon
21st-century Roman Catholic bishops in the Philippines